La Calata Airport or Vista Alegre Airport is located in La Caleta, La Romana, Dominican Republic.
This is a little airport that serves to private aviation in the locality.

See also 
 La Caleta, Santo Domingo
 La Romana Province
 La Romana International Airport

Sources 
 Dominican Republic Airport Sign. Retrieved 30 December 2013.

Airports in the Dominican Republic
Buildings and structures in La Romana Province